Platanthera hyperborea, the northern green orchid, is small orchid found only in Greenland, Iceland, and Akimiski Island in Canada. Numerous authors cite the species as widespread in other parts of Canada and also in the United States; such populations are more correctly referred to as Platanthera aquilonis.

References

External links
Flora of Iceland elements: Platanthera hyperborea, Northern Green Orchid
Canadian Native Orchids, Platanthera aquilonis Sheviak
Flickr, photo of Northern green orchid (Platanthera hyperborea) in Haukadalur, south Iceland. 

hyperborea
Flora of Greenland
Flora of Iceland
Flora of Nunavut
Orchids of Canada
Plants described in 1767
Flora without expected TNC conservation status